Bagnasco is a comune (municipality) in the Province of Cuneo in the Italian region Piedmont, located about  southeast of Turin and about  east of Cuneo.

Bagnasco borders the following municipalities: Battifollo, Calizzano, Lisio, Massimino, Nucetto, Perlo, Priola, and Viola.

References

External links
 Official website 

Cities and towns in Piedmont